George Alfred Christian Knudson, CM (June 28, 1937 – January 24, 1989) was a Canadian professional golfer, who along with Mike Weir holds the record for the Canadian with the most wins on the PGA Tour, with eight career victories.

Early life and career 
Born and raised in Winnipeg, Manitoba, Knudson learned to play golf at the St. Charles Country Club. He won the 1954 and 1955 Manitoba Junior Championships, and the 1955 Canadian Junior Championship. He moved to Toronto in 1958, and worked at the Oakdale Golf Club, where he received instruction and encouragement from the Club, to improve his game. He was then able to secure some financial backing to try the PGA Tour. He won the Manitoba Open in 1958, 1959, and 1960, and the Ontario Open in 1960, 1961, 1971, 1976 and 1978.

Between 1961 and 1972, he won eight tournaments on the PGA Tour. He won the Canadian PGA Championship five times, and won the World Cup with Al Balding in 1968. He wrote a book, The Natural Golf Swing with Lorne Rubenstein.

Knudson's last official PGA TOUR victory was the Kaiser Invitational in October 1972.  However, Knudson nearly won again the next week at the Sahara Invitational.  He carried the lead going into the final round at 15-under par after shooting 65-70-66, but a final round 76 dropped him into a T-7th at 11-under.

Knudson's best finish in a major championship was a tie for second in the 1969 Masters Tournament, one shot behind champion George Archer. Knudson's birdie putt on the 72nd hole to tie Archer came up 3 inches short.

In seven Masters appearances, Knudson posted three top-10s, including 10th in his 1965 debut and sixth a year later.

Knudson left tournament golf in the late 1970s, and started teaching golf, with success, at a facility in the Toronto area. His teaching methods have since been adopted by the Canadian PGA.

In 1988, he was inducted into both Royal Canadian Golf Association Hall of Fame, the Manitoba Sports Hall of Fame and Museum and was made a member of the Order of Canada.

He was inducted into Canada's Sports Hall of Fame in 1969, and the Ontario Sports Hall of Fame in 1996.

Personal life
Knudson had long been a heavy smoker and was diagnosed with lung cancer in 1987.  He recovered well enough to compete at the 1988 Liberty Mutual Legends of Golf Senior tournament. Shortly thereafter, it was discovered the cancer had spread to his brain.  George Knudson died in January 1989 at age 51 and was buried at Mount Pleasant Cemetery in Toronto.

Amateur wins
1954 Manitoba Junior Championship
1955 Manitoba Junior Championship, Canadian Junior Championship

Professional wins (30)

PGA Tour wins (8)

PGA Tour playoff record (3–0)

Other wins (22)
This list may be incomplete 
1958 Manitoba Open
1959 Manitoba Open
1960 Manitoba Open, Ontario Open
1961 Ontario Open
1962 Maracaibo Open Invitational, Puerto Rico Open
1963 Panama Open
1964 Canadian PGA Championship, Caracas Open
1966 Millar Trophy, Canada Cup (individual event)
1967 Canadian PGA Championship
1968 Canadian PGA Championship, World Cup (team event with Al Balding)
1969 Wills Masters (Australia)
1971 Ontario Open
1976 Canadian PGA Championship
1976 Ontario Open
1977 Canadian PGA Championship, Shrine Pro-Am (shared with Dan Halldorson and Gar Hamilton)
1978 Ontario Open, Shrine Pro-Am

Results in major championships

Note: Knudson never played in The Open Championship.

CUT = missed the half-way cut
"T" indicates a tie for a place

Summary

Most consecutive cuts made – 16 (1962 PGA – 1970 PGA)
Longest streak of top-10s – 1 (three times)

Team appearances
Amateur
Americas Cup (representing Canada): 1956

Professional
World Cup (representing Canada): 1962, 1964, 1965, 1966 (individual winner), 1967, 1968 (winners), 1969, 1976, 1977

See also
List of golfers with most PGA Tour wins

References

External links
Profile at Canadian Golf Hall of Fame
George Knudson's biography at Manitoba Sports Hall of Fame and Museum

Canadian male golfers
PGA Tour golfers
Golf writers and broadcasters
Golfing people from Manitoba
Members of the Order of Canada
Sportspeople from Winnipeg
Canadian people of Norwegian descent
Deaths from lung cancer
1937 births
1989 deaths